The Texas State Historical Association (TSHA) is a non-profit educational organization, dedicated to documenting the history of Texas. It was founded in Austin, Texas, on March 2, 1897. In November 2008, the TSHA moved its offices from Austin to the University of North Texas in Denton, Texas. In 2015, the offices were relocated again to the University of Texas at Austin.

Overview
The chief executive officer is Jesús F. de la Teja, and the chief historian is Walter L. Buenger. The association president (2018-2019) is Sarita Hixon; the preceding president was (2017-2018) Paula Mitchell Marks. Other past presidents include Steve Cook (2016-2017), Lynn Denton (2015-2016), John L. Nau III (2014-2015), Gregg Cantrell (2013-2014), Watson Arnold (2012-2013), Merline Pitre (2011-2012), Dianne Garrett Powell (2010–2011) and Walter L. Buenger (2009-2010). Other past presidents included Robert A. Calvert (1989–1990), Alwyn Barr (1992-1993), and Jerry D. Thompson (2001–2002).

History 
On February 13, 1897, ten persons convened to discuss creating a non-profit promoting Texas state history. George Pierce Garrison, chair of the University of Texas history department, led the organizational meeting establishing the association on March 2, 1893. The TSHA elected Oran Milo Roberts as its first president. In addition to Roberts, TSHA charter members included Guy M. Bryan, Anna Pennybacker, Bride Neill Taylor, and Dudley G. Wooten. About twenty or thirty persons attended the charter meeting. One of the founders was John Henninger Reagan.

This first formal meeting of the TSHA included men and several women who became charter members.

At this first meeting, George P. Garrison advocated that archival material about Texas needed to be preserved. Officers were chosen during the meeting, and controversy over what John Salmon Ford called "lady members" caused Ford to storm out of the meeting. Ford wanted to amend the TSHA constitution to replace "members" with "lady members" when the participants were women. Garrison opposed the change, and eventually Taylor spoke up and agreed that there was no need to change anything. Ford could not be placated and after yelling at Taylor, "Madam, your brass may get you into the association, but you will never have the right to get in under that section as it stands," his amendment to create "lady members" was unanimously defeated by the others at the meeting. The other charter members viewed Ford's departure as detrimental, counting on his political influence to help support the group.

The first president was Oran Milo Roberts, with Wooten, Bryan, Julia Lee Sinks, and Charles Corner elected as vice presidents. Membership dues were $2 a year in 1897.

The TSHA held annual meetings in Austin. The first annual meeting was held on June 17, 1897. Topics included "The Expulsion of the Cherokees From East Texas, "The Last Survivor of the Goliad Massacre," "The Veramendt House," "Thomson's Clandestine Passage Around Nacogdoches," and "Defunct Counties of Texas." There was also a group business meeting.

By 1928, the TSHA had 500 members.

Notable members 
 Ben H. Procter, president from 1979 to 1980
 Florence Warfield Sillers

Selected TSHA fellows 
 Paul H. Carlson (1992), Texas Tech professor emeritus and a specialist in Texas and the American West
 A. C. Greene, book critic, historian, poet, journalist, and essayist

Publications
The organization produces four educational publications:
 New Handbook of Texas, a six-volume multidisciplinary encyclopedia of Texas history, culture, and geography. In addition, the Handbook of Texas Online is provided by the TSHA for historical internet research of Texas.
 The Southwestern Historical Quarterly (initially the Quarterly of the Texas State Historical Association) is the oldest continuously published scholarly journal in Texas. The journal features 16 articles per year, covering topics in a range of appeal.
 Riding Line is a quarterly newsletter featuring news and current information on state historical activities.
 The Texas Almanac  is a biennially published reference work providing information for the general public on the history of the state and its people, government and politics, economics, natural resources, holidays, culture, education, recreation, the arts, and other topics. The TSHA acquired the Texas Almanac as a gift from the A. H. Belo Corporation on May 5, 2008.

Educational programs
 Educational Department: Founded in 1939, it promotes the teaching of Texas history in the state's schools.
 Junior Historians of Texas: An extracurricular program for students in grades four through twelve.
 Texas History Day: Provides an opportunity for students to develop their knowledge of history in an annual state-level history fair for students in grades six through twelve.
 History Awareness Workshops: Helps educators develop teaching strategies for informative content and practical classroom applications.
 Heritage Travel Program: a one-week traveling seminar dealing with a specific subject in Texas history held in the summer.

List of presidents
A list of presidents of the TSHA:
 Oran M. Roberts (1897–1898)
 Dudley G. Wooten (1898–1899)
 John H. Reagan (1899–1905)
 David F. Houston (1905–1907)
 A. W. Terrell (1907–1912)
 Zachary T. Fulmore (1912–1915)
 Adele Briscoe Looscan (1915–1925)
 T. F. Harwood (1925–1929)
 Alex Dienst (1929–1932)
 W. R. Wrather (1932–1939)
 Harbert Davenport (1939–1942)
 L. W. Kemp (1942–1946)
 Pat Ireland Nixon (1946–1949)
 Earl Vandale (1949–1951)
 Herbert P. Gambrell (1951–1953)
 Claude Elliott (1953–1955)
 Paul Adams (1955–1957)
 Ralph W. Steen (1957–1959)
 Merle M. Duncan (1959–1962)
 Fred R. Cotten (1962–1964)
 George P. Isbell (1964–1965)
 J. P. Bryan, Sr. (1965–1967)

See also

West Texas Historical Association, based in Lubbock, Texas

References

Citations

Sources

External links

Southwestern Historical Quarterly online
 Quarterly of the Texas State Historical Association. Fulltext via HathiTrust, various dates

State history organizations of the United States
Organizations established in 1897
Historical societies in Texas
University of North Texas
History of Texas
University of Texas System